Mario "Marty" Severino (November 3, 1919 – February 9, 1969) was a professional boxer who held the undisputed world welterweight championship being the NBA, NYSAC, and The Ring welterweight titles. Servo began boxing in the mid-1930s. He became a professional boxer in 1938 and was inducted into the World Boxing Hall of Fame in 1989.

Amateur career
Servo had an impressive amateur career. He captured the Golden Gloves and Diamond Belt Featherweight titles, and ended his career with an impressive record of 91-4.

Professional career
He turned professional as a lightweight and, in his first three years as a professional boxer, managed a 42–0–2 record. As a welterweight he lost two close decisions to the legendary Sugar Ray Robinson.

Servo’s boxing career was interrupted by service in the United States Coast Guard during World War II. He resumed his career after the War and won the World Welterweight Title by knocking out Freddie "Red" Cochrane in the fourth round on February 1, 1946.

Servo and his manager, Al Weill, then made a bad career decision. He agreed to fight the middleweight contender Rocky Graziano in a non-title match. Graziano was a big favorite in New York City and the bout was seen as a big money fight. The two fought on March 29, 1946. This bout effectively finished Servo as a top-line fighter. The heavier and stronger Graziano knocked Servo out and severely injured his nose. Servo never recovered from the injuries and he was forced to relinquish his title and retire. His final ring record, including a knockout loss suffered in an ill-advised comeback attempt, was 48 wins (15 knockouts), 4 losses and 2 draws.

Professional boxing record

See also
List of welterweight boxing champions

References

External links 
 

American people of Italian descent
1919 births
1969 deaths
Welterweight boxers
Sportspeople from Schenectady, New York
American male boxers
United States Coast Guard personnel of World War II